Charles Roger René Jacques de Gaulle (born 25 September 1948) is a French politician. He is the eldest child of Admiral Philippe de Gaulle and grandson of General Charles de Gaulle, and served as a member of the European Parliament (MEP), from 1994 to 2004 (as a member of the Movement for France).

A lawyer in Paris since 1971, Charles de Gaulle was a regional counselor of the Nord-Pas-de-Calais from 1986 to 1992, as a member of the Union for French Democracy (UDF) right-of-center party. From 1989 to 1990, he was the mayor's first assistant in Rueil-Malmaison in the Hauts-de-Seine department. He was present on Valéry Giscard d'Estaing's electoral list during the 1989 European elections, and after resignations from UDF members who preceded him, he took his seat in Strasbourg in 1993.

At the 1994 European elections, he was elected on Philippe de Villiers's Movement for France (MPF)'s electoral list. He joined the National Front in 1999, and was elected in the 1999 European Parliament elections as a representative, but failed to win reelection in the following election.

Personal life 
Charles de Gaulle is the eldest son of Philippe de Gaulle and his wife, Henriette de Montalembert. He is the grandson of General de Gaulle, whose first name he bears, and the brother of Jean and Yves de Gaulle.

In 1978, he married Dolorès Porati (born in 1943 in Ituzaingó, Argentina), with whom he had two children: Philippe (1980) and Édouard (1981).

A graduate of the Institut d'études politiques de Paris (economics and finance section, class of 1970), he practiced as a lawyer at the Paris bar from 1971.

Member of European Parliament 
De Gaulle was initially elected as an MEP in 1993 as a member of the Movement for France. He was also a member of the Liberal and Democratic Reformist Group, a centrist and liberalist group. He served temporarily as a vice-chair on the European Committee for Energy, Research and Technology until July 1994.

In his first full term as an MEP, he stayed loyal to the party. Initially a member of the Europe of Nations Group, a Eurosceptic group, he moved to the Group of Independents, another Eurosceptic group, when the EDN dissolved itself in November 1996. He continued to serve as a member of several committees, and was reelected to a third and final term in 1999, now as a member of Front National.

He became a co-chair of the initial form of the  Technical Group of Independents shortly after the group's formation, although later did not join a group following the dissolution. He lost his seat in the 2004 election, and did not run again.

Time in the National Front 
Starting in 1998, Charles de Gaulle got closer to Jean-Marie Le Pen's National Front (FN), and was photographed with him in the town of Sète in May 1999. He refused to vote for the suspension of Le Pen's parliamentary immunity in Strasbourg. He joined the FN in 1999. Following him joining the party, a letter was published on the left-leaning newspaper Le Monde from over 50 descendants of General de Gaulle, as well as his three brothers, Jean, Yves and Pierre, who stated:

He hit back against these comments on RTL's radio station, stating in an interview: 'The others in the family are failing to understand the real de Gaulle values, which French society is losing.' On May Day, Mr De Gaulle marched alongside Mr Le Pen when he laid a wreath at Joan of Arc's statue.

Despite this, he presented himself at the 1999 European elections, as the party's second choice on the party list, and the 2001 municipal elections in Paris on National Front lists. He was not reelected to the European Parliament in 2004.

References

Charles de Gaulle 1948
20th-century French lawyers
Politicians from Dijon
1948 births
Living people
Movement for France MEPs
MEPs for France 1994–1999
MEPs for France 1999–2004
Union for French Democracy politicians
Movement for France politicians
National Rally (France) MEPs